Cellypha goldbachii is a species of fungi in the family Tricholomataceae, and the type species of the genus Cellypha.

References

External links

Fungi of Europe
Tricholomataceae